Harry L. Decker (1887–1959) was an American film producer associated with Columbia Pictures where he mainly oversaw production on western films. He also produced the 1937 ice hockey-themed mystery The Game That Kills starring Rita Hayworth. He began his career in the silent era as a film editor, working at a variety of studios.

Selected filmography

Editor

 Mary's Ankle (1920)
 Homer Comes Home (1920)
 45 Minutes from Broadway (1920)
 The Woman in the Suitcase (1920)
 What's Your Husband Doing? (1920)
 The Old Swimmin' Hole (1921)
 A Midnight Bell (1921)
 R.S.V.P. (1921)
 Alias Julius Caesar (1922)
 The Deuce of Spades (1922)
 A Tailor-Made Man (1922)
 The Barnstormer (1922)
 Smudge (1922)
 The Girl I Loved (1923)
 A Cafe in Cairo (1924)
 Soft Shoes (1925)
 Silent Sanderson (1925)
 The Prairie Pirate (1925)

Producer

 The Gate Crasher (1928)
 The Kid's Clever (1929)
 Scandal (1929)
 Girl Overboard (1929)
 Gallant Defender (1935)
 Law Beyond the Range (1935)
 Dangerous Intrigue (1936)
 Code of the Range (1936)
 The Cowboy Star (1936)
 Shakedown (1936)
 Motor Madness (1937)
 Two-Fisted Sheriff (1937)
 One Man Justice (1937)
 The Game That Kills (1937)
 Outlaws of the Prairie (1937)
 Two Gun Law (1937)
 Westbound Mail (1937)
 Cattle Raiders (1938)
 West of the Santa Fe (1938)
 Call of the Rockies (1938)
 Law of the Plains (1938)
 The Colorado Trail (1938)
 West of Cheyenne (1938)
 South of Arizona (1938)
 Spoilers of the Range (1939)
 Riders of Black River (1939)
 Outpost of the Mounties (1939)
 The Thundering West (1939)
 The Man from Sundown (1939)
 Western Caravans (1939)
 The Stranger from Texas (1939)
 Texas Stampede (1939)
 Bullets for Rustlers (1940)

References

Bibliography
 Ringgold, Gene. The Films of Rita Hayworth: The Legend and Career of a Love Goddess. Citadel Press, 1980.

External links

1887 births
1959 deaths
American film producers
American film editors
People from California